Diskordia is an ongoing surrealist fantasy web comic book series created by Andrew Blackman (credited as Rivenis) that explores themes such as the nature of reality, consciousness and self-determination. The first issue was released in 2011.

Synopsis 
The story follows the main character the socially maladjusted, cynical and sarcastic Jackal Black as he travels through a portal into a strange world called Diskordia which is described as a transit hub between dimensions. He meets other characters along the way, including Squid Girl, a talking cigar-smoking hat, a journalist interviewing the Mysterious Iverna Deskerna, and the Mephys group, a mega-multimedia corporation with many dark secrets.

Characters 

Jackal Black – A college student who is trying to escape from being framed for murder inters into a dark world called Diskdia.
Squid Girl – A naked girl with a Squid on her head who meets up with Jackal after he enters Diskordia.
Iverna Deskerna – The mysterious CEO of the Mephys group and is the main villain of the series.
Vernon Cutter

Reception 
The comic has received favorable reviews, with ComicBookResources.com saying "Diskordia is a delightfully hypnagogic story with some often epic artwork", GeeksOfDoom.com calling it a "crazy good graphic novel",
and HorrorTalk.com saying, "The artwork is what really stands out in Diskordia. It's unlike anything I've seen before."

Notes 
The comic book had a successful crowd-funding campaign.

References

External links 
Official website

Fantasy comics
2011 webcomic debuts
2010s webcomics